Ian Hall (born 4 November 1946) is a Welsh former rugby union international who played club rugby for Aberavon RFC during the 1970s.

Born in Gilfach Goch, Hall was a strong running centre / wing with a great tackle. Capped eight times by his country between 1967-1974 he captained Aberavon RFC in the 1971/72 season.

A police officer by profession Hall also played for South Wales Police RFC.

After finishing his playing career, Hall moved into coaching where he took control of The Welsh Youth Team, South Wales Police RFC and then Swansea RFC.

References

1946 births
Living people
South Wales Police officers
Aberavon RFC players
Barbarian F.C. players
Pontypridd RFC players
Rugby union centres
Rugby union players from Rhondda Cynon Taf
Rugby union wings
South Wales Police RFC players
Wales international rugby union players
Welsh police officers
Welsh rugby union players